The carpet flatworm (Thysanozoon brocchii) is a  polyclad flatworm in the family Pseudocerotidae.

Description
Carpet flatworms may grow to 8 cm in total length. They have pale bodies with pinkish frilled margins. The upper surface of the animal is covered with short finger-like papillae (protrusions) in pinks, caramels and browns. There is a smale pale protruding fold at the head.

Distribution
Carpet flatworms are found off the South African coast from the Cape Peninsula to Port Elizabeth as well as in the Mediterranean and the Red Sea. They are seen  subtidally and down to at least 35m underwater.

Ecology
These animals use undulations of their body margins to swim. Their dorsal protrusions aid in oxygen uptake and improve camouflage.

Synonyms
According to the World Register of Marine Species, the following species are synonyms of Thysanozoon brocchii:
Eolidiceros brocchi (Risso, 1818)
Eolidiceros panormis Quatrefage, 1845
Planaria brocchi (Risso, 1818)
Planaria dicquemaris Delle Chiaje, 1841
Planaria dicquemaris verrucosa (Delle Chiaje, 1829)
Planaria tuberculata Delle Chiaje, 1828
Planaria verrucosa Delle Chiaje, 1829
Planeolis panormis (Quatrefage, 1845)
Stylochus papillosus Diesing, 1836
Tergipes brocchi Risso, 1818
Thysanozoon brocchii var. cruciatum Laidlaw, 1906
Thysanozoon dicquemaris (Delle Chiaje, 1841)Thysanozoon diesingii Grube, 1840Thysanozoon fockei Diesing, 1850Thysanozoon lagidium Marcus, 1949Thysanozoon panormis (Quatrefage, 1845)Thysanozoon papillosum (Diesing, 1836)Thysanozoon tuberculatum'' (Delle-Chiaje, 1828)

References

External links
 

Turbellaria
Animals described in 1818